= Chathanad =

- Neighbourhood
- Location in Kerala, India
- Coordinates: 10.0787°N 76.2399°E
- Country: India
- State: Kerala
- District: Ernakulam

Languages
  - Official: Malayalam, English
- Time zone: UTC+5:30 (IST)
- Vehicle registration: KL-07
- Coastline: 0 kilometres (0 mi)
- Climate: Tropical monsoon (Köppen)
- Avg. summer temperature: 33 °C (91 °F)
- Avg. winter temperature: 23 °C (73 °F)

Chathanad is a small peninsula in the heart of N.paravoor City in Kerala State, India. Chathanad is a grama panchayat in N.paravoor. Its pin code is 683513.
